Carabiniere has been borne by at least four ships of the Italian Navy and may refer to:

 , a  launched in 1909 and stricken in 1925.
 , a  launched in 1938 and decommissioned in 1965.
 , an  launched in 1967 and decommissioned in 2008.
 , a Bergamini-class frigate launched in 2014.

Italian Navy ship names